Simon Higgins is an Australian screenwriter and author of books for young adults, born in 1958 in England. He arrived in Australia in 1963 after first living in Nigeria, Africa.

Career
Originally a police officer  then private investigator in Adelaide, South Australia, working predominantly on homicide cases, he turned to writing in 1998.

To date he has had 12 novels published, often combining the crime, speculative fiction and historical adventure genres. His works have been divided between Random House, the Hachette Group and Pulp Fiction Press. His short stories have also been published by Pan Macmillan/Ford Street Publishing.

His debut novel, Doctor Id, published in Australia 1998, subsequently released in Italy and serialised in Japan, was listed as a 1999 Notable Book of the Year by the Children's Book Council of Australia.

Higgins’ second novel, Thunderfish was also listed as a 2000 Notable Book by the CBCA.

One of the sequels to Thunderfish, titled Under No Flag, was shortlisted for a Ned Kelly Crime Writing Award in 2002.

In 2007 Higgins won a Fellowship of Australian Writers (FAW) National Literary Award for an unpublished novel about historical Asia.

Higgins trained and competed in Japan in the traditional sword art of Iaido, and placed fifth in Iaido's world titles in Kyoto in 2008 
He has stated that this personal immersion in traditional Asian warrior culture and discipline inspired his most successful novels, which featured samurai and ninja.<ref>Feature article, The Pen and the Sword: Author Simon Higgins, Tale of a Samurai Scribe Paradise, The Weekend Bulletin Magazine, Gold Coast, Queensland, February 10–11, 2007, Cover and pages 10-13</ref>

His 2008 novel, Moonshadow: Eye of the Beast, was an Australian bestseller, was shortlisted for the 2008 Aurealis Fantasy Award and subsequently published in the United States, Germany, Indonesia and England.

As a result, Higgins was invited to appear on Australia's highest rating children's TV show, Saturday Disney, to discuss the book and demonstrate swordplay.

Higgins has written short stories for several anthologies, in the horror, science fiction and historical adventure genres.

He has also authored numerous articles on the craft of writing and creative brainstorming.Magazine article, How Do You Create These 'Strange' YA Novels? by Simon Higgins Viewpoint : On Books for Young Adults , Autumn vol. 7 no. 1 1999; p. 14-15

A prolific public speaker and teacher of creative writing, he is known for incorporating martial arts demonstrations into his presentations to middle school, high school and university-level writing students in Australia, England and Asia.Feature article, ’Drawing out the writers’ Classmate: The Educational Supplement of The Northern Territory News, February 23, 2010

Higgins has been repeatedly noted in teaching journals and the Australian media for his efforts to ‘masculinise reading’.Newspaper story ‘Author has “write” stuff’ Daily Mercury, Mackay, Queensland, 28 May 2002, page 7

In 2010, in recognition of his efforts to promote greater understanding of Asian cultures, Higgins was invited by the Australian government's Asia Education Foundation to become an Ambassador for Asia Literacy.

His novel, Moonshadow: Eye of the Beast'', was subsequently made a recommended school curriculum text by the Asia Education Foundation.

In 2013 Higgins received an Australian Government Endeavour Executive Fellowship Award to live and study ‘Screenwriting for Film & TV Animation’ in China.

This led to his ongoing creative collaboration with Crane Animation, based in Guilin, China, first in the role of creative consultant, then as a screenwriter for their award-winning series Gemini Fables and as coach of the company's in-house writing team.

References

External links

Random House website
Hachette Book Group website

Living people
1968 births
20th-century Australian novelists
21st-century Australian novelists
Australian male novelists
Australian children's writers
Australian screenwriters
Australian male short story writers
20th-century Australian short story writers
21st-century Australian short story writers
20th-century Australian male writers
21st-century Australian male writers